The Jönköping Pentecostal Church is a church building in Jönköping, Sweden. Belonging to the Swedish Pentecostal Movement, the current church is located near the Western Square and was inaugurated on 1 February 1981.

References

External links

20th-century Pentecostal church buildings
Churches in Jönköping
20th-century churches in Sweden
Pentecostal churches in Sweden
Churches completed in 1981